Julia Lang was a film and radio actress and radio presenter. Born in London, she is best known for presenting the BBC radio programme Listen with Mother.

The theme music for the programme was the Berceuse from Gabriel Fauré's Dolly Suite for piano duet, Op. 56. A recording was often used but in an Anglia Television interview in the 1990s, Lang said that during her tenure, when she had finished reading the story, she had to get up (noiselessly), rush across to the piano in the studio and play the Berceuse live.

She married William Shine in 1942. They appeared together in the 1948 film The Red Shoes as "a balletomane" and "a balletomane's mate". Their marriage was dissolved in 1949. She had a son, Stephen.

Lang died on 1 April 2010 at the age of 88 in Aldeburgh, Suffolk.

On-screen appearances

Film
 The Red Shoes (1948) as a Balletomane
 A Date with a Dream (1948) as Madam Docherty
 The Small Back Room (1949) as Danny's Mother (uncredited)
 Stop Press Girl (1949) as Carole Saunders
 Dr. Morelle: The Case of the Missing Heiress (1949) as Miss Frayle
 Under Capricorn (1949) as Susan
 Little Dorrit (1987) as Henry Gowan's mother

Television
 Coronation Street (episode aired 1977) as Ethel Pratt
 Sad Story of Henry (aired in 1953) as narrator

"Are you sitting comfortably?"
Each story on Listen with Mother opened with the phrase "Are you sitting comfortably? Then I'll begin." (sometimes "...Then we'll begin") The question, originally an ad lib by Julia Lang on 16 January 1950, became so well known that it appears up in The Oxford Dictionary of Quotations It has been referenced countless times and sometimes by sampled musicians.

References
 It was included in the lyrics of Moody Blues song, "Are You Sitting Comfortably?" from their 1969 album, On the Threshold of a Dream.
 It was used at the beginning of the Slade song "Did Your Mama Ever Tell Ya?", which appeared on the band's 1976 album, Nobody's Fools.
 It was used English actor John Wood used the line in the 1983 film WarGames.  
 It was also used on the song "It Doesn't Really Matter" by the Canadian band Platinum Blonde on their 1983 Standing in the Dark album.
 It was used as the opening line in the film The Others. 
 In the Doctor Who episode "The Idiot's Lantern", the malign alien presence called the Wire addresses its first victim, the victim this way.

References

External links
 Extract from Listen with Mother

1921 births
2010 deaths
British radio people
British actresses